Andrew John Schofield (better known as Andy Schofield) is an academic and administrator who is the Vice-Chancellor of Lancaster University. A theoretical physicist, he was previously a Pro-Vice-Chancellor at the University of Birmingham and Head of its College of Engineering and Physical Sciences. As an academic, his research focus is in the theory of correlated quantum systems, in particular non-Fermi liquids, quantum criticality and high-temperature superconductivity.

Biography
Andy Schofield was educated at Whitgift School before reading Natural Sciences at Gonville and Caius College, University of Cambridge. In 1993, he obtained his PhD at the Cavendish Laboratory in Cambridge and won a College Research Fellowship at Gonville and Caius. He was a postdoctoral researcher at  Rutgers, New Jersey before his return to Cambridge as a Royal Society University Research Fellow. He joined the School of Physics and Astronomy at the University of Birmingham in 1999, became the Head of School in 2010, and was promoted in 2015 to Pro-Vice-Chancellor and Head of the College of EPS. In May 2020, Andy became the Vice-Chancellor of Lancaster University.

Awards
 The Schuldham Plate (1989), Gonville and Caius.
 Maxwell Medal and Prize (2002) for work on the emergent properties of correlated electrons.
 Fellow of the Institute of Physics (2002).

References

External links
 Staff page at Theoretical Physics Research Group, University of Birmingham

Theoretical physicists
British physicists
Alumni of Gonville and Caius College, Cambridge
Academics of the University of Birmingham
Maxwell Medal and Prize recipients
Fellows of the Institute of Physics
Living people
Year of birth missing (living people)